E3 ubiquitin-protein ligase RNF114  is a protein that in humans is encoded by the RNF114 gene.

References 

Human proteins